Mid Dorset and North Poole is a constituency represented in the House of Commons of the UK Parliament since 2015 by Michael Tomlinson, a Conservative.

Boundaries 

1997–2010: The District of Purbeck wards of Bere Regis, Lytchett Matravers, Lytchett Minster, St Martin, and Wareham, the District of East Dorset wards of Corfe Mullen Central, Corfe Mullen North, and Corfe Mullen South, and the Borough of Poole wards of Alderney, Broadstone, Canford Heath, Canford Magna, and Creekmoor.

2010–present: The District of Purbeck wards of Bere Regis, Lytchett Matravers, Lytchett Minster and Upton East, Lytchett Minster and Upton West, St Martin, and Wareham, the District of East Dorset wards of Colehill East, Colehill West, Corfe Mullen Central, Corfe Mullen North, Corfe Mullen South, and Wimborne Minster, and the Borough of Poole wards of Broadstone, Canford Heath East, Canford Heath West, and Merley and Bearwood.

The constituency was created in 1997 from parts of the seats of North Dorset (Corfe Mullen Central, Corfe Mullen North, Corfe Mullen South, Lytchett Matravers, and Lytchett Minster wards), Poole (Broadstone, Canford Heath, Canford Magna, and Creekmoor wards), South Dorset (Bere Regis, St Martin, and Wareham wards), and Bournemouth West (Alderney ward). In 2010, Colehill and Wimborne Minster were added to the seat from North Dorset, Alderney was moved back to Bournemouth West, and Creekmoor back to Poole.

In September 2016, the Boundary Commission suggested abolishing Mid Dorset and North Poole. Parts of the constituency would form part of new Blandford & Wimborne and Broadstone, Ferndown & Kinson constituencies, whilst south-westerly parts of the constituency would be included in the updated boundaries of the South Dorset constituency.

Constituency profile
This area includes the north of the Purbeck Hills Area of Outstanding Natural Beauty and two tourist towns, namely Wimborne Minster and Wareham, the latter at one end of Poole Harbour.  Income levels are close to the national average, taking into account the high proportion of pensioners living across the area. and levels of rented and social housing are below the national average, particularly levels seen in cities.

Members of Parliament

Elections

Elections in the 2010s

Elections in the 2000s

Elections in the 1990s

See also 
 List of parliamentary constituencies in Dorset

Notes

References

Constituencies of the Parliament of the United Kingdom established in 1997
Parliamentary constituencies in Dorset